Parmenolamia unifasciata is a species of beetle in the family Cerambycidae, and the only species in the genus Parmenolamia. It was described by Stephan von Breuning in 1950, from a specimen collected in Quang Tre Vietnam.

Description
This beetle has hairy brown and white elytra. The antennae are long, filiform, hairy and unarmed. The head has no distinct lateral or anterior projections. The pronotum is approximately subquadrate (about as long as wide) and the lateral margins of the pronotum have no distinct spines or tubercles. The wings are complete and the legs have smooth, broadly divergent tarsal claws.

References

Morimopsini
Beetles described in 1950